Heliamphora sp. 'Akopán Tepui' is an undescribed taxon of marsh pitcher plant known only from Akopán Tepui in Venezuela, where it grows at elevations of 1800–1900 m. It resembles H. heterodoxa in many respects, but has larger and broader pitchers, narrower tepals, and a smaller nectar spoon.

References

Akopan Tepui
Flora of Venezuela
Undescribed plant species
Flora of the Tepuis